Independence/Democracy (IND/DEM) was a Eurosceptic political group active during the 2004–2009 term of the European Parliament. The group was the successor to the Europe of Democracies and Diversities (EDD) group.

The group collapsed following the 2009 European elections after losing many of its MEPs and was succeeded by Europe of Freedom and Democracy (EFD) for the 2009–2014 term of the European Parliament.

History
The 2004 European Parliament elections were reported as a good result for Eurosceptic parties. 37 MEPs (33 on 20 July, with four more the next day) from the UK Independence Party (UKIP), June Movement (Denmark), Movement for France (France), Northern League (Italy), ChristianUnion – Reformed Political Party (Netherlands), Popular Orthodox Rally (Greece), June List (Sweden), Independent Democrats (Czech Republic), the League of Polish Families (Poland) and an Independent MEP from the Republic of Ireland, joined in the first week of the new Parliament to form the Eurosceptic group called "Independence/Democracy" (IND/DEM), succeeding the group called "Europe of Democracies and Diversities" (EDD) that had existed during the European Parliament's 1999–2004 term.

In the first week, IND/DEM assigned a UKIP MEP to the Committee on Women's Rights and Gender Equality. The MEP, Godfrey Bloom, promptly made comments including "No self-respecting small businessman with a brain in the right place would ever employ a lady of child-bearing age" and "I am here to represent Yorkshire women who always have dinner on the table when you get home. I am going to promote men's rights." The remarks engendered outrage from a range of fellow politicians.

One UKIP MEP never made it to IND/DEM. MEP Ashley Mote was expelled from UKIP prior to IND/DEM's formation when it became known that he faced charges for housing benefit fraud. Mote went on to join the far-right Identity, Tradition, Sovereignty group before being convicted in 2007.

The Northern League MEPs eventually all left the group after their expulsion from IND/DEM following an incident involving a T-shirt and the Jyllands-Posten Muhammad cartoons controversy. MEPs from the League of Polish Families also left the group, although not all and not all at once.

After having been suspended from UKIP following his arrest on fraud allegations, MEP Tom Wise left IND/DEM in June 2008.

By 24 June 2008, IND/DEM had 22 MEPs.

After the 2009 European Parliament elections, 18 IND/DEM MEPs from four Member States were elected for the 2009–2014 term (the Seventh European Parliament). The great majority of these seats (thirteen) were from the UK Independence Party, with others being two from the ChristianUnion – Reformed Political Party of the Netherlands, two from the Popular Orthodox Rally of Greece, and one from Libertas France. But that didn't meet the threshold laid down in the European Parliament's Rules of Procedure. So when the Seventh European Parliament started on 14 July 2009, IND/DEM would not qualify as a group.

On 30 June 2009, it was reported the remnants of IND/DEM were to unite with the remnants of another collapsing group, Union for a Europe of Nations (UEN), to create a new group whose official name was not yet determined.

On 1 July 2009 a press conference was held launching the new group. That press conference named the new group Europe of Freedom and Democracy. IND/DEM had ceased to exist.

Structure

Subgroups
IND/DEM was a coalition of MEPs from two distinct wings of Euroscepticism: a reformist subgroup (sometimes referred to as Eurorealists) made up of those MEPs who believed that the EU was essentially desirable if reformed and who supported greater transparency and control over the EU bureaucracy, and a secessionist subgroup consisting of those MEPs (notably UKIP) who believed that the EU was inherently wrong even if reformed and who advocated withdrawal from the EU.

Organisation
IND/DEM had a joint political leadership. The group's co-chairs were Nigel Farage (UKIP) and Hanne Dahl, the latter succeeding Kathy Sinnott, who in turn succeeded long-time MEP Jens-Peter Bonde (June Movement) on his retirement in May 2008. Farage represented the secessionist subgroup, and Sinnott the reformist subgroup. The leadership was loose, enabling the two subgroups to unite around the broad principles of democracy and transparency which were embodied in its statute and to which IND/DEM MEPs were expected to adhere. The day-to-day running of the group was performed by its secretariat, and its secretaries-general were Claudine Vangrunderbeeck and Herman Verheirstraeten.

Membership

Elected membership by party at 11 June 2009

After the 2009 European Parliament elections, 18 IND/DEM MEPs (too few for a viable group) were elected as follows:

Membership by party at 24 July 2008
IND/DEM member parties as of 24 July 2008 were as follows:

Membership by country at December 2007

A December 2007 European Parliament document considered the groups. Page 9 of that document had a table. That table gave the number of MEPs for each group and member state at December 2007. That table's data for IND/DEM is depicted as percentages in the diagram on the right.

Such support for IND/DEM as was expressed came from Northern European states, with especial reference to the member states of the North-West. Its strongholds were Sweden and Denmark, who sent "June list" MEPs from June List and June Movement to the Parliament, and the United Kingdom, with 13% of its MEPs at December 2007 coming from UKIP and sitting with IND/DEM. As of December 2007 no member state had more than 13% of its MEPs sitting with IND/DEM and eighteen member states (Austria, Belgium, Bulgaria, Cyprus, Estonia, Finland, Germany, Hungary, Italy, Latvia, Lithuania, Luxembourg, Malta, Portugal, Romania, Slovakia, Slovenia, Spain) had none.

Membership at formation at 20–23 July 2004 

The IND/DEM MEPs at 20–23 July 2004 were as follows:

Activities

In the news
Activities performed by IND/DEM in the period between 1 June 2004 and 1 June 2008 that resulted in an entry on Google News include: 
 seeking to allow Parliament to be filmed;
 criticising EC President Barroso for taking a cruise on a yacht owned by Spiro Latsis prior to the Commission giving a Latsis shipyard a grant of €10 million;
 trying to get a European Parliament auditor's report on alleged abuses of staff allowances published;
 opposing the appointment of Rocco Buttiglione as Justice Commissioner;
 arguing against the Constitution Treaty,
 arguing against the Lisbon Treaty,
 arguing against a deeper Europe;
 expelling Lega Nord and the League of Polish Families;
 arguing against the two-person Presidency,
 arguing against the two-seat Parliament,
 arguing against attempts to fund plans to improve EP turnout;
 arguing for greater control of the commission by Parliament,
 arguing for decentralisation,
 arguing for mandatory lobbying disclosure,
 supporting whistleblower Hans-Peter Martin.

Parliamentary activity profile

The debates and votes in the European Parliament are tracked by its website and categorised by the Groups that participate in them and the rule of procedure that they fall into. The results give a profile for each Group by category and the total indicates the Group's level of participation in Parliamentary debates. The activity profile for each Group for the period 1 August 2004 to 1 August 2008 in the Sixth European Parliament is given on the diagram on the right. IND/DEM is denoted in orange.

The website shows IND/DEM as participating in 43 motions, making it one of the most inactive Groups during the period.

Publications
IND/DEM publications included the Prague Declaration of October 2005, which restated their disapproval of the Constitution Treaty and belief that the values it embodied should not be resurrected, and the Delphi Declaration of July 2007, which made similar points concerning the Treaty of Lisbon. IND/DEM also published a newsletter called EU Watch, which gave a eurosceptic view on the EU activities of the day.

References

External links
Independence/Democracy Group in the European Parliament 
EUDemocrats official website

More about independent poem

Political parties established in 2004
Former European Parliament party groups
Euroscepticism